Exneria is a genus of marsh beetles in the family Scirtidae. There is one described species in Exneria, E. ruficollis.

References

Further reading

 

Scirtoidea
Monotypic Elateriformia genera
Articles created by Qbugbot